The Pollin Prize for Pediatric Research was an annual award given to physicians who contributed important advances to the field of pediatrics, and was the only existing international pediatric award.  The prize was created in 2002 by Irene and Abe Pollin, and funded by the Linda and Kenneth Pollin Foundation.  It was administered by the NewYork-Presbyterian Hospital, and as of 2003, Dr. Rudolph Leibel was chairman of the selection panel.

The prize is no longer awarded.

Recipients
2010 – Roscoe O. Brady and Charles R. Scriver
2009 – Basil S. Hetzel
2008 – John Allen Clements
2007 – Samuel L. Katz
2006 – No award 
2005 – Eric N. Olson, Abraham Rudolph
2004 – Alfred Sommer
2003 – Emil Frei, Emil J. Freireich, Donald Pinkel, and James F. Holland
2002 – Dilip Mahalanabis, Norbert Hirschhorn, David Nalin, and Nathaniel F. Pierce

See also

 List of medicine awards

References

Medicine awards
Awards established in 2002
Pediatrics
2002 establishments in New York (state)